Employees Only is a 1958 American short documentary film produced by Kenneth G. Brown. It was produced by Hughes Aircraft Company for the President's Committee on Employment of the Physically Handicapped and features interviews of physically disabled employees of Hughes Aircraft.

Employees Only was nominated for an Academy Award for Best Documentary Short.

See also
 List of American films of 1958

References

External links

1958 films
1958 documentary films
American short documentary films
1950s short documentary films
1950s English-language films
1950s American films